Amelia Marzec (born 1980) is an American Interactive Artist based in New York City.

Art

Marzec's work explores the effects that various technologies (particularly telecommunications) and the social conditions that surround them have on aspects of our interpersonal relationships such as privacy, intimacy, and publicity.  She has frequently cited her experience of losing hearing in one ear, as well as her experience working inside a media giant compromised by the PRISM program (America Online) as formative.

Career

Marzec received her Bachelor of Fine Arts (BFA) from Mason Gross School of the Arts in New Brunswick, New Jersey and her Master of Fine Arts (MFA) from 
Parsons School of Design.  Her work has been exhibited at Flux Factory, New York Hall of Science, Governor's Island, MIT, SIGGRAPH, and the DUMBO Arts Festival. She has been awarded a residency at Eyebeam, the A.I.R. Gallery Emma Bee Bernstein Fellowship, a full commission for LUMEN, and a nomination for the World Technology Awards for Art.

Her work has been featured in Wired, Make, and Hyperallergic.

References

External links
 Amelia Marzec

American contemporary artists
American women artists
1980 births
Living people
Artists from New York (state)
Parsons School of Design alumni
Mason Gross School of the Arts alumni
21st-century American women